Jeffrey Deitch (pronounced DIE-tch; born 1952) is an American art dealer and curator. He is best known for his gallery Deitch Projects (1996–2010) and curating groundbreaking exhibitions such as Lives (1975) and Post Human (1992). Deitch was director of the Museum of Contemporary Art, Los Angeles (MOCA) from 2010 to 2013. He currently owns and directs Jeffrey Deitch Gallery, an art gallery with locations in New York and Los Angeles.

Early life and education 
Deitch was born in 1952 and grew up in Connecticut, where his father ran a heating-oil and coal company and his mother was an economist. He attended public high school in West Hartford, Connecticut, from 1967 to 1970. He was an exchange student in Paris in 1968, and in Japan in 1969. He graduated from Wesleyan University in 1974 and received an MBA from Harvard Business School in 1978.

Career 
Deitch opened his first gallery as a college student in 1972 at the Curtis Hotel, a rented hotel parlor in Lenox, Massachusetts, and sold out the first week. He later moved to New York and worked as a receptionist at John Weber Gallery in SoHo. From 1979 to 1988, Deitch helped develop and co-manage the art advisory and art finance department at Citibank. In this capacity, he lent money to small galleries like Gracie Mansion on Avenue A for its 1984 renovation.

From 1988 to 1996 Deitch was a successful private dealer and art adviser to a number of collectors, including Jose Mugrabi. 

In 1989, he bid US$10.5 million and paid $11.55 million for Jackson Pollock's silvery No. 8, 1950, then a record at auction for a work by the artist and the second-highest price at auction for a work by any contemporary artist.

Over his career, Deitch has crafted for himself a unique role that merges curatorial profile with the business side of art.

Curatorial projects
Since 1975, Deitch has curated exhibition internationally. Among his most celebrated projects are Lives (1975), Born in Boston (1979), New Portrait (1984) at Moma PS1, and Form Follows Fiction (2001) at Castello di Rivoli, Turin. Between 1988 and 1992, Deitch curated several shows at Deste Foundation, Athens. Among them, Cultural Geometry (1988), Psychological Abstraction (1989), Artificial Nature (1990), and Post Human (1992). He also served as one of the curators of the Venice Biennale's Aperto section in 1993.

Art writing 
In 1980, he became a regular columnist of Flash Art and the first U.S. editor of Flash Art International. The same year he wrote one of the first press mentions of Jean-Michel Basquiat in the article "Report from Times Square," covering The Times Square Show for Art in America. His writings have appeared on numerous international magazines: Art in America, Artforum, Garage, Interview magazine, Kaleidoscope, Paper magazine, and Purple magazine.

Deitch Projects (1996–2010)
In 1996 Deitch opened the Deitch Projects gallery in the Soho section of New York City. His first shows included works by Vanessa Beecroft, Jocelyn Taylor, Nari Ward, and Mariko Mori. Soon after, he bought the building housing Canal Lumber, a bigger space around the corner on Wooster Street. The first major exhibition project there was of a Barbara Kruger video-and-slide-projection show in the fall of 1997.

An early advocate of graffiti art in the 1980s, he later introduced New York to the style of street art which had originated in San Francisco in the 1990s among artists on the fringe of the skateboard scene. Deitch became well known as a supporter of young artists like Kehinde Wiley and Cecily Brown, while also representing the work of more established artists like Keith Haring and Jeff Koons (Deitch threw Koons' 50th birthday party). In 2006, he bought Bridget Riley's Untitled (Diagonal Curve) (1966), at Sotheby's for $2.1 million, nearly three times its $730,000 high estimate and also a record for the artist. In 2009, he wrote the strategic plan for the Mori Art Museum in Tokyo.

In 2014, Deitch published Live the Art on the 15-years history of Deitch Projects.

Museum of Contemporary Art, Los Angeles
In 2010 Jeffery Deitch was appointed Director to the Museum of Contemporary Art, Los Angeles (MOCA).  Deitch closed Deitch Projects and also resigned from the authentication committee of the estate of Jean-Michel Basquiat; he was a close friend of the artist. During his three-years tenure, Deitch advised and curated seminal exhibitions such as Dennis Hopper: Double Standard (2010), The Painting Factory: Abstraction After Warhol (2012) and Art in the Streets (2011), the first major U.S. museum survey of graffiti and street art. Additionally, Deitch conceived MOCAtv, the first original YouTube channel dedicated to fine art.

There was controversy about Deitch's tenure at MOCA. In 2012 Deitch fired MOCA's longtime chief curator Paul Schimmel, leading to the resignation of four MOCA board members – artists John Baldessari, Ed Ruscha, Barbara Kruger, and Catherine Opie – in protest. 
 Deitch lived in an 8,000-square-foot house in Los Feliz, Los Angeles formerly owned by Cary Grant.

Return to art dealing
In 2015, Deitch began hosting shows at 76 Grand Street in New York, one of his former gallery spaces. In July 2016, he reopened his Lower Manhattan gallery at 18 Wooster Street, the space he ran from 1996 to 2010 and rented out to the Swiss Institute for the following five years. Deitch now runs the two spaces under Jeffrey Deitch Inc. Since reopening the gallery, Jeffrey Deitch has organized exhibitions by Tom Sachs, Eddie Peake, Walter Robinson, Ai Weiwei, Kenny Scharf, and Austin Lee, among others.

In 2018, he opened a new  space in Hollywood, designed by Frank Gehry, specifically to mount what he described as "museum-level" exhibitions. The gallery inaugurated with a solo exhibition of Ai Weiwei, followed by Urs Fischer, and Judy Chicago.

In 2019 Deitch edited Unrealism, a publication on new figurative painting featuring the most groundbreaking contemporary artists and their important predecessors.

In 2020, Deitch conceived the creation of the Gallery Association Los Angeles (GALA for short), to "generate excitement about the L.A. gallery scene" and shared his idea with a group of gallerists in Los Angeles. In May 2020, GALA launched galleryplatform.la, an online platform that serves the dynamic Los Angeles art community with editorial content and rotating online viewing rooms.

References

External links 
 Maxwell Williams, "Inside and Out: Jeffrey Deitch's Life in the Art World", KCET Artbound, 2019.
 Deborah Vankin, "Jeffrey Deitch left MOCA amid controversy. Now he's returning to L.A. to launch a gallery on his own terms", Los Angeles Times, September 19, 2018.
 Anna Louie Sussman, "How Jeffrey Deitch, Citibank, and Christo Created the Art Market as We Know It", Artsy, July 30, 2017
 Donatien Grau, "Jeffrey Deitch", Flash Art International, October 3, 2014.
 Carl Swanson, "Jeffrey Deitch Curates Jeffrey Deitch: The Return of the Art World's Most Essential Zelig", New York Magazine, January 12, 2014. 
 Calvin Tompkins, "A Fool For Art. Jeffrey Deitch and the exuberance of the art market", The New Yorker, November 5, 2007.

1952 births
American art dealers
Art in Greater Los Angeles
Directors of museums in the United States
Harvard Business School alumni
Living people
Wesleyan University alumni
People from Los Feliz, Los Angeles